Vincenzo Franco (1 June 1917 – 4 March 2016) was an Italian prelate of Roman Catholic Church. He was one of oldest Roman Catholic bishops and Italian bishops.

Franco was born in Trani, Italy and was ordained a priest on 6 July 1947. Franco was appointed bishop of Anglona-Tursi Diocese on 12 December 1974 and consecrated on 26 January 1975. Franco was then appointed bishop of the Diocese of Otranto on 27 January 1981 and remained there until his retirement on 8 April 1993.

External links
Catholic-Hierarchy
Anglona Site (Italian)
Ortanto Site (Italian)

20th-century Italian Roman Catholic bishops
1917 births
2016 deaths